Zoltán Kovács is a Hungarian sprint canoeist who competed in the late 1980s. He won three gold medals at the ICF Canoe Sprint World Championships with two in the K-4 1000 m (1986, 1987) and one in the K-4 10000 m (1985).

References
 

Hungarian male canoeists
Living people
Year of birth missing (living people)
ICF Canoe Sprint World Championships medalists in kayak
20th-century Hungarian people